Andrei Nazarov (born 9 January 1965) is a retired decathlete, who competed for the Soviet Union and later for his native country Estonia. He was born in Tallinn. His personal best in the men's decathlon was 8322 points, achieved in 1987 (Sochi).

Achievements

Coaching
After retiring as a decathlete, Nazarov started coaching. He has coached decathlete Erki Nool and heptathlete Larisa Netšeporuk. As of 2009, he coaches long jumper and sprinter Ksenija Balta, long jumper Tõnis Sahk, triple jumper Lauri Leis, and decathlete Indrek Turi.

References

External links
 
 
 
 

1965 births
Living people
Estonian decathletes
Athletes (track and field) at the 1992 Summer Olympics
Athletes (track and field) at the 1996 Summer Olympics
Olympic athletes of Estonia
Athletes from Tallinn
Estonian athletics coaches
Estonian people of Russian descent
World Athletics Championships athletes for Estonia